Thunderbirds 2086 is the English dubbed version of the Japanese anime series , loosely inspired by the original Gerry Anderson Supermarionation series Thunderbirds. The English dub was produced by ITC Entertainment, the original production company for Thunderbirds, although it is not officially recognized as canon because Gerry Anderson and Sylvia Anderson were not involved.

The series includes music and sound effects from Thunderbirds and Anderson's other series: Stingray, Captain Scarlet and the Mysterons, Joe 90, UFO, and Space: 1999. A total of 24 episodes were produced, but only 18 were broadcast on Fuji TV in 1982.

Background 
The series takes place in 2086 and chronicles the adventures of a rescue team called the "Thunderbirds" ("TechnoBoyager" in the Japanese version, a portmanteau of "technology" and "voyager" with the last part coming out as "boyager" due to V's and B's being switched around in the Japanese language), who work for the International Rescue Organization (IRO). In the Japanese version, the two entities are the same.

Unlike the original Thunderbirds, in which the International Rescue organization was small-scale and family-run, Thunderbirds 2086 depicts it as a vast organization with numerous branches controlled by the Federation, the series' equivalent of the United Nations. Although the English version is called Thunderbirds 2086, the Tracy family, who ran International Rescue in the original series, is not mentioned. In the English version, "Thunderbirds" refers to the team, while in the original series, it merely refers to their vehicles. The animated series otherwise has notable similarities to the original, with most episodes revolving around a natural or man-made disaster that the Thunderbirds team must investigate and help resolve.

Unlike the original series, Thunderbirds 2086 also has an ongoing story arc revolving around a breakaway independence group known as the Shadow Axis, led by the mysterious Star Crusher. There is a strong suggestion in the series that Star Crusher is not human and may be some kind of alien.

Voice cast

Japanese voice cast 
 Hiroko Maruyama as Pawl 
 Junichi Takeoka as Hidaka Raiji 
 Kei Tomiyama as Eric Joans 
 Kiyoshi Kobayashi as Gerald Simpson 
 Manami Ito as Catharine Hayward 
 Ryusei Nakao as Sammy Edkins Jr. 
 Takeshi Aono as Gran Hansen

English voice cast 
 Alexander Marshall
 Earl Hammond 
 Eleanor Kearney 
 Henry Mandell 
 Joan Audiberti 
 John Bellucci 
 Keith Mandell 
 Lucy Martin
 Maia Danziger 
 Paolo Audiberti 
 Peter Fernandez

Vehicles and characters 

Thunderbird 2086 features 17 vehicles, each with different characteristics and purpose. Each craft's name contains the abbreviated designation "TB", which stands for "TechnoBoyager" in the Japanese version and "Thunderbird" in the English version. 

The vehicles are described to a party of school children visiting Arcology in the episode "Child's Play" (except TB-8, 11, 14 (mentioned only), 15, and 16). The remaining vehicles are shown in the 1983 Thunderbirds 2086 annual.

 TB-1/Thunderbird 1 is an aircraft similar in design to the Space Shuttle. It can fly in space and combine with TB-2 and TB-3 to form a larger vessel. It is piloted by Captain Dylan Beyda (who is from Japan).
 TB-2/Thunderbird 2 is a large cargo hauler identical in purpose to the original series' Thunderbird 2 (though blue instead of green in colour). It stores the smaller interchangeable vehicles inside its cargo bay, rather than with hangar pods. Pods are used for large vehicles (notably TB-5) and are carried at the rear of the vehicle between the engines, with TB-2 landing vertically when carrying a pod. TB-2 has space flight capabilities and is piloted by Captain Jesse Eric Rigel Jones (who is from Texas) and Captain Jonathon Samuel Jordan Edkins Jr. (who is from New York and of Jamaican descent).
 TB-3/Thunderbird 3 is an APC-like mobile command center used to monitor situations on the ground. It can split in half and merge with TB-1 and TB-2 for transportation to remote parts of the world and is capable of short rocket hops. It is piloted by Captain Grant Hanson (the same name in the Japanese version, but without the "t"), the oldest and most senior ranking of the Thunderbirds (who is from Germany).
 TB-4/Thunderbird 4 is a yellow submarine, similar to but larger than its original series counterpart. It is too large to be carried by TB-2 and usually makes its way to the disaster area after being directly launched from the Arcology. It is piloted by Captain Catherine Kallan Heyward James, the only female crew member of the Thunderbirds team.
 TB-5/Thunderbird 5 is a large ground-tunneling vehicle reminiscent of the original series' pod vehicle known as the Mole. However, TB-5 is much larger. It is carried into missions by TB-2.
 TB-6/Thunderbird 6 is the largest Thunderbird, a massive space station that serves a similar purpose to the original series' Thunderbird 5. TB-6 is manned by hundreds if not thousands of IRO personnel and is described as a floating city.
 TB-7/Thunderbird 7 is a one-man fast interceptor aircraft that can be stored either inside TB-1 or TB-2 and used as a drone when required.
 TB-8/Thunderbird 8 is only seen in one episode and is shown carried inside TB-1 and capable of drone operation. The 1983 Annual lists it as the unmanned Computer Controlled Air Transport, stored on TB-1 and used for disposal of dangerous materials.
 TB-9/Thunderbird 9 is a walker-robot used for repair and upgrade work. It is always carried by another craft.
 TB-10/Thunderbird 10 is an exceptionally fast spacecraft that can reach speeds of over Mach 176 and is used for rapid travel from Earth to other planets.
 TB-11/Thunderbird 11 is an armored high-speed ground vehicle carried aboard TB-3. Although never shown or referenced in the show, it is shown in the 1983 Annual. It is listed as being 5 meters long, weighing one ton, capable of 370 km/h, and equipped with computer-controlled sensors and an array of weapons.
 TB-12/Thunderbird 12 is a bulldozer-like vehicle that can move hefty weights with an extending platform, similar in design to the original series of elevator cars. It is also capable of operating underwater.
 TB-13/Thunderbird 13 is a smaller submarine that is carried inside TB-4 and deployed to reach places too small for TB-4 to travel. It is capable of 60 knots in the water. Although never shown on screen, it is stated in the episode "Child's Play" to be capable of flying at speeds of up to Mach 1.
 TB-14/Thunderbird 14 never appears but is also referenced in "Child's Play". It is a deep-water bathyscaphe capable of travelling far below crush depth, carried aboard TB-4.
 TB-15/Thunderbird 15 is a small tracked vehicle stored inside TB-3 or TB-5 and capable of drone operation. It is listed in the 1983 Annual as a Mobile Computer and can be manned or unmanned as required.
 TB-16/Thunderbird 16 is The Mole, carried aboard TB-3 or TB-5 as required and virtually identical to the original series vehicle. The only difference is that TB-16 is unmanned (according to the 1983 Annual) and capable of operating underwater.
 TB-17/Thunderbird 17 is a huge spacecraft that is bigger than any other Thunderbird except TB-6, where it spends most of its time docked. TB-17 is used for extended operations away from Earth and can store all of the other Thunderbirds (apart from TB-6) inside it.

Commander Jared Simpson (same name in the Japanese version) is the commanding officer of the team and gives the heroes their missions. He is the "Jeff Tracy" figure of the animated series. He has a nephew, Skipper Simpson (named Paul in the Japanese version), a young boy who idolizes the Thunderbirds and hopes to one day join their ranks.

Oddly, the introductory dialogue in the English version describes the characters as cadets, while all of the episodes rank them as captains. Grant Hanson is the senior captain in charge of the whole group.

Team base
Similar to the original show, the team's headquarters is an island in the Pacific, known as "Arcology". Its main building is a huge pyramid containing an entire city inside. Like the original International Rescue, a space station in orbit is maintained to monitor mayday calls; in this series, the space station is Thunderbird 6. Both Arcology and TB-6 are home to thousands of people.

Episodes 

The original run of Thunderbirds 2086 in Japan was cancelled after only eighteen of its twenty-four episodes aired in 1982. The remaining six episodes were finally aired during a 2008 rerun on the Home Drama Channel.

In total, only three countries broadcast the show in its entirety: the United States in 1983, Australia in 1984, and Malaysia in 1985. The 1986 broadcast in the United Kingdom fared worse than the original Japanese broadcast, being cancelled after only thirteen episodes aired. Around 1985, Spain aired Spanish dubs of four episodes under the title Pájaros Trueno 2086.

See also 
 X-Bomber – previous Gerry Anderson-inspired production by Kimio Ikeda and Jin Productions. Created by Go Nagai.
 Firestorm – Japanese anime co-created by Gerry Anderson

References

External links 
 
 

1982 anime television series debuts
Japanese children's animated action television series
Japanese children's animated space adventure television series
Japanese children's animated science fiction television series
Action anime and manga
Adventure anime and manga
Aviation television series
Fuji TV original programming
ITV children's television shows
Science fiction anime and manga
Showtime (TV network) original programming
Television series by ITC Entertainment
Animated television series reboots
Television series set in the 2080s
Television series set in the future
Works based on Thunderbirds (TV series)
English-language television shows